The Convent of las Madres Carmelitas (Spanish: Convento de las Madres Carmelitas) is a convent located in Boadilla del Monte, Spain. It was declared Bien de Interés Cultural in 1974.

References 

Buildings and structures in Boadilla del Monte
Convents in Spain
Bien de Interés Cultural landmarks in the Community of Madrid